Travis are a Scottish rock band formed in Glasgow in 1990, composed of Fran Healy (lead vocals, rhythm guitar), Dougie Payne (bass guitar, backing vocals), Andy Dunlop (lead guitar, banjo, backing vocals) and Neil Primrose (drums, percussion). The band's name comes from the character Travis Henderson (played by Harry Dean Stanton) from the film Paris, Texas (1984).

The band released their debut album, Good Feeling (1997), to moderate success where it debuted at number nine on the UK Albums Chart and was later awarded a silver certification from the BPI in January 2000. The band gained greater success with their second album, The Man Who (1999), which spent nine weeks at number one on the UK Albums Chart, totalling 134 weeks in the top 100 of the chart. In 2003, The Man Who was certified 9× platinum by the BPI, representing sales of over 2.68 million in the UK alone. Following this success, the band released their third effort, The Invisible Band (2001) album. The Invisible Band went on to match the success found with their previous album, where it debuted at number one on the UK Albums Chart and spent a total of four weeks at the top spot, fifteen weeks in the top ten, and a total of fifty-five weeks in the top 100 chart, as well as peaking at thirty-nine on the US Billboard 200 album chart, spending a duration of seven weeks in the Billboard 200 chart. A year following the release of The Invisible Band, the BPI awarded Travis with a 4× platinum certification for the album.

In recent years, the band's discography has included studio albums 12 Memories (2003), The Boy with No Name (2007), Ode to J. Smith (2008), Where You Stand (2013), Everything at Once (2016) and 10 Songs (2020). In 2004, the band released their first greatest hits album, Singles, which spent nineteen weeks in the top 100 of the UK albums chart. Travis have twice been awarded best band at the BRIT Awards and were awarded the NME Artist of the Year award at their 2000 ceremony, and in 2016 were honoured at the Scottish Music Awards for their outstanding contribution to music. The band are widely said by the media to have paved the way for other bands such as Coldplay to go on to achieve worldwide success throughout the 2000s, particularly with the success of The Man Who.

Craft Recordings celebrated the 20th anniversary of Travis' breakthrough year with two simultaneous releases: Live at Glastonbury '99, plus expanded editions of The Man Who – both of which were released on 21 June 2019.

History

Formation and early years (1990–1993)

The band that would become Travis was formed by brothers Chris Martyn (bass) and Geoff Martyn (keyboards) along with Simon Jarvis (drums). Andy Dunlop, a school friend at Lenzie Academy, was drafted in on guitar. The line-up was completed by a female vocalist, Catherine Maxwell, and the band's name became "Glass Onion", after the Beatles song of the same name. Neil Primrose joined to replace Jarvis.  Parting company with their singer in the spring of 1991, they auditioned for a new vocalist. Having met each other through Primrose pouring him a pint, an untrained art student, Fran Healy, then joined after being invited to audition by Primrose. Healy joined the band on the day he enrolled at The Glasgow School of Art, in the autumn of 1991. Two years later, with the option of music holding more appeal, Healy dropped out of art school, and inspired by songwriters such as Joni Mitchell, assumed songwriting responsibilities. With brothers Chris and Geoff Martyn on bass and keyboards, in 1993, the fivesome released a privately made CD, The Glass Onion EP, featuring the tracks "Dream On", "The Day Before", "Free Soul" and "Whenever She Comes Round". 500 copies of the EP were made and were recently valued at £1000 each. Other songs they recorded but were left off are "She's So Strange" and "Not About to Change".

The band won a talent contest organised by the Music in Scotland Trust, who promised £2,000 so that Travis could deal-hunt at a new music seminar in New York. Two weeks before they were due to leave, however, the prize was instead given to the Music in Scotland Trust Directory.
The band showed promise but had yet to evolve into a decent line-up capable of fulfilling it and spent several years treading water. According to their publisher Charlie Pinder: "They were a band that everyone in the A&R community knew about and would go and see every now and then. But they weren’t very good. They had quite good songs; Fran always did write good songs." While on a visit to Scotland, American engineer and producer Niko Bolas, a long-time Neil Young and Rolling Stones associate, tuned into a Travis session on Radio Scotland, and heard something in the band's music which instantly made him travel to Perth to see them. Healy: "He told us we were shit, took us in the studio for four days, and taught us how to play properly, like a band. He was ballsy, rude, and New York pushy. He didn't believe my lyrics and told me to write what I believed in and not tell lies. He was Mary Poppins, he sorted us out." The band recorded a five-song demo, which included the song "All I Want to Do Is Rock".

Changes and debut album (1994–1997)

With the sudden death of his grandfather, a grief-stricken Healy shut himself away, refusing to talk to anyone. Emerging a week later, and with a clear vision of where he now wanted Travis and their music to go, Healy dispensed with the band's management and publicity agent. Having been repeatedly knocked back by the British record industry, the band couldn't afford to stay around the country for another few years and so decided to move to New York, feeling that the U.S. might be more suited to their style of music. Before leaving Healy told the band that they should send the demo to Charlie Pinder of Sony Music Publishing, who they had known for a few years and regularly sent songs to, saying: "If he's not into it, then we'll go." Pinder was immediately impressed by the song "All I Want to Do is Rock", which he felt was a dramatic change for the band: "It was harder, more exciting, sexy; all things that they never really were. They turned a corner." After performing a secret gig for Pinder and his boss at Sony, Blair McDonald, they were signed to Sony Music Publishing. The immediate impact of was that the founding member and keyboard player Geoff Martyn was removed while the bassist, his brother Chris, was replaced with Healy's best friend Dougie Payne. The band was moved to London where they were given a rehearsal room and a house.

Payne, a fellow art student who worked as a Levi's shop assistant, had not played bass guitar previously and initially proved reluctant to take up the new instrument. After having completed a crash course of a couple of weeks, Payne played with the new line-up for the first time in a free space above the Horse Shoe Bar in Glasgow.

Once set up in London the band spent between nine months and a year recording new songs. The band played their first London show at the Dublin Castle in Camden. With around twenty good songs ready they then approached managers Colin Lester and Ian McAndrew of Wildlife Entertainment who then introduced the band to Andy MacDonald, owner of Go! Discs Records and founder of Independiente Records. Sensing greatness, he negotiated with Wildlife Entertainment and signed Travis for a reputed £100,000 of his own money. The band is signed to MacDonald personally, not to the label—if MacDonald ever leaves the Sony-financed label Independiente Records, the band goes with him (commonly referred to in the industry as a "golden handcuffs" clause).

Produced by Steve Lillywhite of U2 fame, Travis' first studio album, 1997's Good Feeling, is a rockier, more upbeat record than the band's others to date. Recorded at the legendary Bearsville Studios in Woodstock, New York, the place where Travis favourite The Band recorded, the album contained singles such as "All I Want to Do Is Rock", "U16 Girls", the Beatle'esque "Tied to the 90s", "Happy" and "More Than Us". Guest musicians include Page McConnell of Phish playing keyboards on the title track "Good Feeling". The album reached No. 9 on the UK Albums Chart, but with little radio play, it slipped from the chart relatively quickly. Although it heralded Travis' arrival on the British music scene, received extremely positive reviews, and substantially broadened Travis' fan base, it sold just 40,000 copies. Following the release, Travis toured extensively, their live performances further enhancing their reputation. This included support slots in the UK for Oasis, after Noel Gallagher became an outspoken fan.

Mainstream success (1998–2001)

Travis' second album, 1999's The Man Who, was produced by Nigel Godrich and partially  recorded at producer Mike Hedges' chateau in France. The band continued recording at, among other studios, Abbey Road Studios in London. Shortly after release, The Man Who initially looked as though it would mirror the release of Good Feeling. Although it entered the UK Albums Chart at No. 7, with little radio play of its singles, it quickly slipped down. Worse, many critics who had raved about the rocky Good Feeling rubbished the album for the band's move into more melodic, melancholic material (for example, "Travis will be best when they stop trying to make sad, classic records"—NME). When the album slipped as far as No. 19, it stopped. Word of mouth and increasing radio play of the single "Why Does It Always Rain on Me?" increased awareness of the band and the album began to rise back up the chart. When Travis took the stage to perform this song at the 1999 Glastonbury Festival, after being dry for several hours, it began to rain as soon as the first line was sung. The following day the story was all over the papers and television, and with word of mouth and increased radio play of this and the album's other singles, The Man Who rose to No. 1 on the UK chart. It also eventually took Best Album at the 2000 BRIT Awards, with Travis being named Best Band. Music industry magazine Music Week awarded them the same honours, while at the Ivor Novello Awards, Travis took the Best Songwriter(s) and Best Contemporary Song Awards.

Travis followed the release of The Man Who with an extensive 237-gig world tour, including headlining the 2000 Glastonbury, T in the Park and V Festivals, and a US tour leg with Oasis. In Los Angeles, an appearance of the band at an in-store signing forced police to close Sunset Strip. The gentle, melodic approach of The Man Who became a hallmark of the latter-day Britpop sound, and inspired a new wave of UK-based rock bands, with acts such as Coldplay and Starsailor soon joining Travis in challenging the chart dominance of urban and dance acts. The title "The Man Who" comes from the book The Man Who Mistook His Wife for a Hat by neurologist Oliver Sacks. The majority of songs for this album were written before Good Feeling was even released. "Writing to Reach You", "The Fear" and "Luv" being penned around 1995–96, with "As You Are", "Turn" and "She's So Strange" dating back as far as 1993 and the early Glass Onion EP.

The title of Travis' following album, 2001's The Invisible Band, again produced by Nigel Godrich, reflects the band's genuine belief that their music is more important than the group behind it. Featuring such songs as "Sing" (the most played song on British radio that summer), "Side", the McCartneyesque "Flowers in the Window", "Indefinitely", "Pipe Dream" and "The Cage", and recorded at Ocean Way Studios in Los Angeles, the album again made No. 1 on the UK chart, generally received widespread critical acclaim, with the band again taking Best British Band at the annual BRIT Awards. It also received Top of the Pops Album of the Year. The album also had an impact across the Atlantic, the popularity in the US of the single "Coming Around", a non-album track with Byrdsesque harmonies and 12-string guitar, enhancing this. Travis again followed the release of The Invisible Band with an extensive world tour.

Primrose's accident and change in direction (2002–2006)

In 2002 things came to a halt for Travis, with the band almost calling it quits, after drummer Neil Primrose went head-first into a shallow swimming pool while on tour in France, just after a concert at Eurockéennes festival. Breaking his neck, he almost died due to spinal damage. If not for his road crew, he also would have drowned. Despite the severity of the accident, Primrose has since made a full recovery.

With Primrose having recovered, Travis regrouped and re-evaluated. Moving into a cottage in Crear, Argyll and Bute, they set up a small studio, and over two weeks, came up with nine new songs that would form the basis of their fourth studio album, 2003's 12 Memories. Produced by Travis themselves, Tchad Blake, and Steve Orchard, the album marked a move into more organic, moody and political territory for the band. Although this seems to have alienated some fans, the album generally received very positive reviews (for example, "Then, of course, there's Travis and their album 12 Memories [Epic]. You just have to sit there and listen to it all the way through, and it will take you on a real journey. It's like an old album. It's like the Beatles' Revolver [1966]. Fran Healy's voice and lyrics are mesmerizing and beautiful"—Elton John), singles such as "Re-Offender" did very well on the UK chart, and the album itself reached No. 3. Yet it also saw them lose ground in the U.S., where Coldplay had usurped Travis during their 2002 absence. Much later, Fran Healy spoke about the album as a whole being about him working through his own clinical depression, and the 12 memories being 12 reasons for him reaching his depressed state. At the time this wasn't mentioned, but the revelation that Healy was depressed ties in with the band's decision to take longer writing and releasing their next work.

In 2004, Travis embarked on a highly successful tour of Canada, the US, and Europe (supported by Keane in the UK), and in November 2004, the band released a successful compilation of their singles, Singles, as well as the new tracks, "Walking in the Sun" and "The Distance" (written by Dougie Payne). This was followed by a series of small, intimate gigs at UK venues such as Liverpool's Cavern Club, London's Mean Fiddler, and Glasgow's Barrowlands. While on tour, the band made a series of impromptu acoustic "busks", raising money for the charity The Big Issue. In addition to other performances, they headlined the 2005 Isle of Wight Festival and T in the Park.

On 2 July 2005, Travis performed at Live 8's London concert, and four days later, at the Edinburgh 50,000 – The Final Push concert. Travis also participated in Band Aid 20's re-recording of "Do They Know It's Christmas?"—Healy and friend Nigel Godrich playing leading roles in its organisation. Healy is a part of the Make Poverty History movement, having recently made two trips to Sudan with the Save the Children organisation. On 13 July 2006, the members of Travis stuck a giant post-it sticker on the front door of the Downing Street home of British Prime Minister, Tony Blair. It read: "Tony Blair—Some steps forward, much to do at the G8, make poverty history."

Artistic re-evaluation (2007–2009)

Travis released a fifth studio album, The Boy with No Name, on 7 May 2007. Nigel Godrich was the album's executive producer, while Mike Hedges and Brian Eno were also involved. The album is named after Healy's son, Clay, whom Healy and his partner Nora were unable to name until four weeks after his birth. Healy has described the process of making the album as "like coming out of the forest", and that the band is now "in a good place", contrasting with the dark mood surrounding 12 Memories. Travis played at the Coachella Music and Arts Festival on 28 April 2007. At the Virgin Megastore tent in the festival, The Boy With No Name was available to purchase over a week early. Reviews of the album were mixed. The album's first single, "Closer", was released on 23 April 2007 and peaked at No. 10 in the UK Singles Chart. The music video for the single features a cameo role from actor and friend of the band, Ben Stiller. Stiller plays the role of a supermarket manager. The follow-up singles to "Closer" were "Selfish Jean" and "My Eyes".

For the promotional tour for the album (which started just before its release), Travis included a new touring pianist, Claes Björklund from Sweden. Björklund's first appearance with the band was when they played at the Oxford Brookes Union on 19 March 2007, prior to the album's release. The band dedicated their performance at the Vic Theater in Chicago to their producer Nigel Godrich. The album's tour lasted until December 2007 ending in a home-coming gig in Glasgow. The band visited for the first time places including Buenos Aires and Santiago de Chile (playing as part of a festival co-headlined with The Killers and Starsailor) during this tour.

Following a short UK tour, where the band tested some new material, Travis recorded their sixth album in two weeks in February/March 2008, having been inspired by the speed and simplicity of their recent recording session with Beatles engineer Geoff Emerick while participating in a BBC programme celebrating the 40th Anniversary of the Sgt. Pepper's Lonely Hearts Club Band album. It was announced around this time that the band and long term record label Independiente had split amicably.

In early June 2008, a vinyl EP of the song "J. Smith" was announced online as the first release from Ode to J. Smith for 30 June. It was an EP limited to 1000 copies and not an 'official' single, instead more of a taster of the album for fans.

Fran Healy said, "The album is called Ode to J. Smith partly giving a heads up to the key song and partly because all the songs are written about nameless characters or to nameless characters." He has also described the album as a novel with 12 chapters, with each chapter being a song. In live shows promoting the album in spring 2009, Healy said the song Friends was written from the perspective of the girlfriend of the book's protagonist (J.Smith), about friends who are only there to ask for favours. The album would be released through their own record label Red Telephone Box, with the lead single "Something Anything" being released on 15 September. Two weeks later on 29 September, Ode to J. Smith was released. The band also headlined a 12-gig UK tour to coincide with the releases between 22 September and 8 October. Early reviews were very positive, with some calling it Travis' best record ever.
 The second single released from Ode To J. Smith was "Song to Self", on 5 January 2009. In the December 2008 issue of Q Magazine, Ode To J Smith appeared at number 28 on a list of the Readers' Best Albums Of 2008.

Where You Stand (2010–2013)

A live acoustic album featuring Healy and Dunlop was released on 19 January 2010.

In 2011 Travis returned to live performances. They played at the Maxidrom Festival in Moscow, in May; at G! festival, Faroe Island and the Rock’n Coke Festival in Istanbul, Turkey in July. On 31 October, Fran Healy performed a concert in Berlin along with Keane's Tim Rice-Oxley. They performed several Keane songs. Travis recorded some songs for their next album at the end of September 2011 and they continued writing new songs in February 2012 with Keane. Fran Healy confirmed on his Twitter account that the new Travis album will be released in the first half of 2013. Travis played together on 4 May 2012 at the Sandance Festival in Dubai. They also played at the Porto Student Festival in Portugal on 9 May. The band performed in the Norwegian Festival in July 2012 and Belladrum Festival in August 2012.

A pre single teaser track called "Another Guy" from the band's forthcoming seventh album was released as a free download from the band's official website on 20 March 2013. On 25 April 2013, they revealed that the new album Where You Stand would be released on 19 August 2013 via Kobalt Label Services, and that the first eponymous single "Where You Stand" was released on 30 April.

Everything at Once, outstanding music contribution and Almost Fashionable (2013–2016)
A post from Travis on their Instagram page confirmed that recording had commenced on the band's eighth album at Hansa Tonstudio in Berlin in January 2015. On 25 November 2015, Travis shared a free download single 'Everything at Once' and announced two UK live shows in January 2016. A new album, also titled Everything at Once, was released on 29 April 2016.

In 2016 at the 18th annual Scottish Music Awards, Travis were presented with the award for their outstanding contribution to music.

Travis’ June 2016 tour of Mexico formed the backdrop for Almost Fashionable: A Film About Travis, a documentary directed by Healy. The film stars Wyndham Wallace, a music journalist and acquaintance of Healy's in Berlin who was invited to travel with Travis to Mexico because he had previously expressed his distaste for the band. The film had its premiere in 2018 at the 72nd Edinburgh International Film Festival, where it won the Audience Award.

The Man Who anniversary and 10 Songs (2017–present)
In 2017, Travis decided to celebrate the 18th anniversary of their seminal 1999 album The Man Who as they were currently writing songs and figured that they would be busy promoting a new album on what would have been The Man Who’s 20th anniversary. To mark the occasion, the band re-released the album as a limited edition box set.

In September 2017, the band also performed the album in full at two shows in Manchester and London, followed by more full album UK shows in June and December of the following year.

Finally, on the 20th anniversary of The Man Who, the band re-released the album reissue box set, along with the live album Live at Glastonbury ‘99, a recording of the set which turned out to be a pivotal moment in kickstarting Travis’ commercial success despite the band members feeling that they had performed poorly.

On 10 December 2019, Travis released “Kissing in the Wind”, a song from their upcoming new album which had previously been included in their 2018 documentary Almost Fashionable: A Film About Travis. Another single, “A Ghost”, was released on 3 June 2020, along with details of the band's upcoming ninth studio album 10 Songs, released on 9 October of the same year.

On 17 July 2022, the group supported Gerry Cinnamon at his concert at Hampden Park in Glasgow.

Collaborations and solo work
The band have played with a number of other artists, including Paul McCartney, Graham Nash, Noel Gallagher, and Jason Falkner. Travis guest starred on Feeder's "Tumble and Fall", performing backing vocals at the end of the song. This, because Feeder were recording their album Pushing the Senses and Travis were in the next studio.

An adaptation of the Oasis song "Half the World Away", as performed by Healy, was used as the intro music for a sketch in The Adam and Joe Show entitled "The Imperial Family". The sketch itself was a parody of The Royle Family (to which the Oasis song lends itself as the theme music).

In June 2007, Travis participated in BBC Radio 2's project to celebrate the 40th anniversary of the Beatles' Sgt. Pepper's Lonely Hearts Club Band. All the album's tracks were re-recorded by contemporary artists, supervised by the original engineer, Geoff Emerick, using the same 4-track studio equipment. Travis contributed a rendition of "Lovely Rita". The band wanted to be as faithful to the original as possible, even to the extent of recording the guitars in the stairwell of Abbey Road Studios to recreate the acoustics.

In 2010, Travis contributed a live version of their song "Before You Were Young" to the Enough Project and Downtown Records' Raise Hope for Congo compilation. Proceeds from the compilation fund efforts to make the protection and empowerment of Congo's women a priority, as well as inspire individuals around the world to raise their voice for peace in Congo.

Healy released his first solo album entitled Wreckorder in October 2010. Recorded in Berlin, New York and Vermont and produced by Emery Dobyns (Patti Smith, Noah and the Whale), the album features Paul McCartney, Neko Case and Noah and the Whale's Tom Hobden.

Band members
 Fran Healy – lead vocals, rhythm guitar, piano (1990–present)
 Dougie Payne – bass guitar, backing vocals (1994–present)
 Andy Dunlop – lead guitar, banjo, backing vocals (1990–present)
 Neil Primrose – drums, percussion (1990–present)

Former members
 Geoff Martyn – keyboards (1990–1996)
 Chris Martyn –  bass guitar (1990–1996)
 Simon Jarvis – drums, percussion (1990-1990)
 Catherine Maxwell – lead vocals (1990–1991)

Discography

Studio albums
Good Feeling (1997)
The Man Who (1999)
The Invisible Band (2001)
12 Memories (2003)
The Boy with No Name (2007)
Ode to J. Smith (2008)
Where You Stand (2013)
Everything at Once (2016)
10 Songs (2020)
Live albums
Live at Glastonbury ‘99 (2019)
Compilation albums
 Singles (2004)

List of awards and nominations received by Travis
Brit Awards
The Brit Awards are the British Phonographic Industry's annual pop music awards.

|-
| 1998 || Travis || British Breakthrough Act || 
|-
| rowspan="3" | 2000 || Travis || British Group || 
|-
| The Man Who || British Album of the Year || 
|-
| "Why Does It Always Rain on Me?" || British Single of the Year || 
|-
| 2001 || "Coming Around" || British Video of the Year || 
|-
| rowspan="3" | 2002 || Travis || British Group || 
|-
| The Invisible Band || British Album of the Year || 
|-
| "Sing" || British Video of the Year || 
|}

Q Awards
The Q Awards are the United Kingdom's annual music awards run by the music magazine Q.

|-
| rowspan="3" | 1999 || Travis || Best New Act || 
|-
| The Man Who || Best Album || 
|-
| "Why Does It Always Rain on Me?" || Best Single || 
|-
| rowspan="3" | 2000 || rowspan="2" | Travis || Best Act in the World Today || 
|-
| Best Live Act || 
|-
| "Coming Around" || Best Video || 
|-
| rowspan="2" | 2001 || Travis || Best Act in the World Today || 
|-
| The Invisible Band || Best Album || 
|}

References

External links
 

 
Scottish rock music groups
Post-Britpop groups
Britpop groups
British soft rock music groups
Musical groups from Glasgow
Musical groups established in 1990
Brit Award winners
Ivor Novello Award winners
NME Awards winners
Independiente Records artists
Epic Records artists